An autogram ( = self,  = letter) is a sentence that describes itself in the sense of providing an inventory of its own characters. They were invented by Lee Sallows, who also coined the word autogram. An essential feature is the use of full cardinal number names such as "one", "two", etc., in recording character counts. Autograms are also called 'self-enumerating' or 'self-documenting' sentences. Often, letter counts only are recorded while punctuation signs are ignored, as in this example:

The first autogram to be published was composed by Sallows in 1982 and appeared in Douglas Hofstadter's "Metamagical Themas" column in Scientific American.

The task of producing an autogram is perplexing because the object to be described cannot be known until its description is first complete.

Self-enumerating pangrams
A type of autogram that has attracted special interest is the autogramic pangram, a self-enumerating sentence in which every letter of the alphabet occurs at least once. Certain letters do not appear in either of the two autograms above, which are therefore not pangrams. The first ever self-enumerating pangram appeared in a Dutch newspaper and was composed by Rudy Kousbroek. Sallows, who lives in the Netherlands, was challenged by Kousbroek to produce a self-enumerating 'translation' of this pangram into English—an impossible-seeming task. This prompted Sallows to construct an electronic Pangram Machine. Eventually the machine succeeded, producing the example below which was published in Scientific American in October 1984:

Sallows wondered if one could produce a pangram that counts its letters as percentages of the whole sentence–a particularly difficult task since such percentages usually won't be exact integers. He mentioned the problem to Chris Patuzzo and in late 2015 Patuzzo produced the following solution:

Later in 2017, Matthias Belz decided to push the boundaries further by making a pangrammatic autogram with a precision of five decimal places:

However, no matter the precision of the rounding, the percentage of the letters used are still not exact. Therefore, in that same year Matthias Belz went on to create an pangrammatic autogram that uses exact percentages instead of rounded values:

A shorter exact percentage autogram can be formed if the pangrammatic property is elided:

Generalizations
Autograms exist that exhibit extra self-descriptive features. Besides counting each letter, here the total number of letters appearing is also named:

Just as an autogram is a sentence that describes itself, so there exist closed chains of sentences each of which describes its predecessor in the chain. Viewed thus, an autogram is such a chain of length 1. Here follows a chain of length 2:

Reflexicons
A special kind of autogram is the 'reflexicon' (short for "reflexive lexicon"), which is a self-descriptive word list that describes its own letter frequencies. The constraints on reflexicons are much tighter than on autograms because the freedom to choose alternative words such as "contains", "comprises", "employs", and so on, is lost. However, a degree of freedom still exists through appending entries to the list that are strictly superfluous.

For example, "Sixteen e's, six f's, one g, three h's, nine i's, nine n's, five o's, five r's, sixteen s's, five t's, three u's, four v's, one w, four x's" is a reflexicon, but it includes what Sallows calls "dummy text", which is only having one of some letter. Dummy text are in the form "one #", where "#" can be any typographical sign not already listed. Sallows has made an extensive computer search and conjectures that there exist only three pure (i.e., no dummy text) English reflexicons.

Other variants
There are many different variants to autograms. One such variant is by representing the letter frequencies using roman numerals:

The frequency count can also be replaced with the decimal form rather than its corresponding english numerals form:

See also
Quine (computing)
Diagonal lemma

References

External links
 Autograms in various languages

Self-reference
Word play
Constrained writing